The 2010–11 season is Hyderabad cricket team's 77th competitive season. The Hyderabad cricket team is senior men's domestic cricket team based in the city of Hyderabad, India, run by the Hyderabad Cricket Association. They represent the region of Telangana in the state of Andhra Pradesh in domestic competitions.

Competition Overview

Squads
 Head Coach : Venkatapathy Raju (until 8 November 2010), M. V. Sridhar (after 8 November 2010) 
 Batting Coach : Vivek Jaisimha (until 8 November 2010) 
 Fielding Coach : Noel David

Rayudu moved to the Baroda from the Hyderabad ahead of the 2010–11 season. Sridhar replaced Raju as the Hyderabad coach on 8 November 2010 for the rest of the season.
NKP Salve Challenger Trophy
Suman got selected to the India Green squad for the 2010-11 NKP Salve Challenger Trophy, a List-A cricket tournament in India.

Duleep Trophy
Ojha and Sandeep got selected to the South Zone squad for the 2010-11 Duleep Trophy, a first-class cricket tournament in India.

Deodhar Trophy
Ojha and Ravi Teja got selected to the South Zone squad for the 2010-11 Deodhar Trophy, a List-A cricket competition in India.

Indian Premier League
The local franchise, Deccan Chargers got Ojha while the newly formed franchise, Kochi Tuskers got Laxman in the IPL Auction. Among uncapped players, Suman got picked by the Mumbai Indians while the Deccan Chargers picked Ashish, Bhandari, Ravi Teja and Arjun Yadav for the 2011 Indian Premier League, a professional Twenty20 cricket league in India.

Syed Mushtaq Ali Trophy
The Hyderabad team, led by Dwaraka Ravi Teja, began their campaign in the Syed Mushtaq Ali Trophy, a Twenty20 tournament in India, with a win against the Andhra at Hyderabad on 14 October 2010. The half-century from Paramveer Singh led the Hyderabad to 148 before their bowlers, Pagadala Naidu, Ashish Reddy and Alfred Absolem bowled out the Andhra for 58. In the second match, the half-century from Raiphi Gomez who added an unbeaten 94-run partnership with Robert Fernandez helped the Kerala register an eight wicket win before Prasanth Parameswaran's two-wicket haul held the Hyderabad to 148. The Hyderabad registered their second loss in three matches as the unbeaten half-century from Subramaniam Badrinath helped the Tamil Nadu chase the revised target of 102 in 15 overs. Earlier, the Tamil Nadu were able to put pressure on the Hyderabad by taking regular wickets and restrict them to 104. In a rain-reduced five-overs-a-side encounter, Tirumalasetti Suman's knock of 38 in 16 balls, Naidu's three-wicket haul in a single over and Amol Shinde's tight last over helped the Hyderabad defeat the Goa by 14 runs in their fourth match. The collective effort from the Karnataka's batsmen, Mayank Agarwal, Robin Uthappa and Manish Pandey helped their team register a four-wicket victory over before Aditya Sagar's four wicket haul restricted the Hyderabad to 148 in their final zonal match. This loss knocked the Hyderabad out from the tournament as they finished fourth in the South Zone with two wins and three losses.

Points Table
South Zone

  Top two teams advanced to knockout stage.
 Points system : W = 4, T/NR = 2, L = 0.

Matches
Zonal Stage

Statistics
Most runs

 Source: Cricinfo
Most wickets

 Source: Cricinfo

Ranji Trophy

The Hyderabad team, led by Dwaraka Ravi Teja, began their campaign in the Ranji Trophy, the premier first-class cricket tournament in India, against Rajasthan at Jaipur on 1 November 2010. They were bowled out for 21, the lowest-ever total in the Ranji Trophy, in their first innings of the match against Rajasthan. In the aftermath of the batting collapse and humiliating defeat against Rajasthan, Hyderabad's head coach, Venkatapathy Raju and their batting coach, Vivek Jaisimha were sacked from their roles while the batsmen for the Hyderabad, Arjun Yadav, Anirudh Singh, Anoop Pai and Mungala Arjun were dropped from the team. The Hyderabad appointed M. V. Sridhar as the head coach for the rest of the season and promoted their U-22 batsmen, Parth Jhala, Hanuma Vihari, Bavanaka Sandeep and Abdul Basheer into the senior team. They finished fourth in Group B of the Plate League and failed to advance to the knockout stage with a win, a loss and three draws.

Points Table
Plate League Group A

  Top two teams advanced to knockout stage.
 Points system : Win by an innings or 10 wickets = 6, Win = 5, Draw with first innings lead = 3, Draw with first innings deficit = 1, No Result = 1, Loss = 0.

Matches
Group Stage

Statistics
Most runs

 Source: Cricinfo
Most wickets

 Source: Cricinfo

Vijay Hazare Trophy
The Hyderabad team, led by Dwaraka Ravi Teja, began their campaign in the Vijay Hazare Trophy, a List-A cricket tournament in India, with a loss against the Andhra at Palakkad on 11 February 2011. An all-round performance from the Andhra bowlers led by Shankara Rao and Tekkami Atchuta Rao restricted the Hyderabad to 115 while their batsmen completed the chase with six wickets to spare. In the second match, the half-centuries from Ravi Teja and Akshath Reddy eased the Hyderabad chase as they register their first win of this tournament by seven wickets against the Kerala. Earlier, the Kerala batsmen were troubled by the Hyderabad spinners, Amol Shinde and Pragyan Ojha to restrict them to 222. In the third match, Goa spinners shared eight wickets between them as they bowled out the Hyderabad to 158 while an unbeaten half-century from Rohit Asnodkar completed the chase with a seven-wicket win for the Goa. The Karnataka opener, Ganesh Satish completed the chase with more than 16 overs to spare while their seamers, Abhimanyu Mithun and Vinay Kumar, earlier troubled the Hyderabad top-order to restrict them for 120 and hand their third loss in four matches. Dinesh Karthik's unbeaten knock of 154 in just 83 balls supported by the century from Abhinav Mukund helped the Tamil Nadu score 376 against the Hyderabad in the last zonal match. The Hyderabad started the chase strongly with a century from Ravi Teja but no support from the other end led the Hyderabad lose the match by 88 runs as they finished sixth in the South Zone and failed to qualify for the knockout stage with a win and four losses.

Points Table
South Zone

Matches
Zonal Stage

Statistics
Most runs

 Source: Cricinfo
Most wickets

 Source: Cricinfo

See also
Hyderabad cricket team 
Hyderabad Cricket Association

References

External links
Hyderabad cricket team official site

Cricket in Hyderabad, India
Cricket in Telangana
Sport in Telangana